Pat Ahern may refer to:

 Pat Ahearne (born 1969), American baseball pitcher
 Pat Aherne (1901–1970), English film actor
 Pat Ahern (director) (born 1932), Irish priest, musician and founder of Siamsa Tíre, the Irish National Folk Theatre
 Pat Ahern (skier) (born 1960), American Olympic skier